The following outline is provided as an overview of and topical guide to Uranus:

Uranus – seventh planet from the Sun. It has the third-largest planetary radius and fourth-largest planetary mass in the Solar System. Uranus is similar in composition to Neptune, and both have different bulk chemical composition from that of the larger gas giants Jupiter and Saturn. For this reason, scientists often classify Uranus and Neptune as "ice giants" to distinguish them from the gas giants. Uranus's atmosphere is similar to Jupiter's and Saturn's in its primary composition of hydrogen and helium, but it contains more "ices" such as water, ammonia, and methane, along with traces of other hydrocarbons. The interior of Uranus is mainly composed of ice and rock.

Classification of Uranus 

 Astronomical object
 Gravitationally rounded object
 Planet
 Giant planet
 Ice giant
 Planet of the Solar System
 Outer planet
 Superior planet

Location of Uranus 

 Milky Way Galaxy – barred spiral galaxy
 Orion Arm – a spiral arm of the Milky Way
 Solar System – the Sun and the objects that orbit it, including 8 planets, the seventh and second-furthest planet from the Sun being Uranus
 Orbit of Uranus

Movement of Uranus 

 Orbit of Uranus
 Rotation of Uranus

Features of Uranus 

 Atmosphere of Uranus
 Climate of Uranus
 Rings of Uranus

Natural satellites of Uranus 

 Moons of Uranus

Inner moons of Uranus 

 Cordelia
 Ophelia
 Bianca
 Cressida
 Desdemona
 Juliet
 Portia
 Rosalind
 Cupid
 Belinda
 Perdita
 Puck
 Mab

Large moons of Uranus 

 Miranda
 List of geological features on Miranda
 Ariel
 List of geological features on Ariel
 Umbriel
 Titania
 Oberon

Irregular moons of Uranus 

 Francisco
 Caliban
 Stephano
 Trinculo
 Sycorax
 Margaret
 Prospero
 Setebos
 Ferdinand

History of Uranus 

History of Uranus

Exploration of Uranus 

Exploration of Uranus

Flyby missions to explore Uranus 

 Voyager 2

Future of Uranus exploration

Proposed missions to explore Uranus 

 Uranus orbiter and probe

See also 

 Outline of astronomy
 Outline of the Solar System
 Outline of space exploration

References

External links 

 Uranus at European Space Agency
 NASA's Uranus fact sheet
 Uranus Profile at NASA's Solar System Exploration site
 Planets – Uranus A kid's guide to Uranus.
 Uranus at Jet Propulsion Laboratory's planetary photojournal. (photos)
 Voyager at Uranus (photos)
 Uranus (Astronomy Cast homepage) (blog)
 Uranian system montage (photo)
 

Uranus
Uranus